Richard Howard Kline  (November 15, 1926 – August 7, 2018) was an American cinematographer, known for his collaborations with directors Richard Fleischer and Michael Winner. He was a second-generation filmmaker, being the son of cinematographer Benjamin H. Kline and the nephew of ASC co-founder Phil Rosen. He was nominated twice for an Academy Award for Best Cinematography, for Camelot (1968) and King Kong (1976).

Career
Kline was born in Los Angeles, California in 1926; his father was cinematographer Benjamin H. Kline.

After Kline graduated from high school in 1943 at the age of 16, his father got him a job as a slate boy working for Columbia Pictures the same year, and one of the films he worked on as a slate boy was Cover Girl.

A year later, in 1944, Kline joined the U.S. Navy, serving from 1944 to 1946. By the time he had joined the Navy, he was already a first assistant cameraman. Kline was shipped out to the Pacific Theatre, where he would film battles out on the ocean. Kline left the Navy in 1946, and went to Paris in 1948, after he could not find a job in Hollywood.

After graduating from Sorbonne University with a degree in Fine Art and Fine History, he married and returned to Hollywood, and returned to Columbia in 1951, working first as a camera assistant, and then a camera operator. Kline began working as a cinematographer in 1963, and in 1967, he became a member of the American Society of Cinematographers.

Kline worked extensively with director Richard Fleischer, and was nominated for the Academy Award for Best Cinematography on two occasions. Much of his work was in the realm of genre cinema, and he collaborated with directors like Michael Winner, Richard Fleischer, Robert Wise, and Brian De Palma. Kline also worked alongside other cinematographers such as Charles Lawton Jr., Burnett Guffey, James Wong Howe, and Philip H. Lathrop.

He was nominated for an Academy Award for his work on Camelot in 1967, and for another Oscar for his work on King Kong in 1976, and was the recipient of the 20th annual ASC Lifetime Achievement Award in 2006.

He died from natural causes at his home in Brentwood, Los Angeles, at the age of 91, on August 7, 2018, the 51st anniversary of when he joined the A.S.C.

Filmography

Film

Television

Awards and nominations
Nominee Best Cinematography — Academy Awards (Camelot) (1967)
Nominee Best Cinematography — Academy Awards (King Kong) (1976)
Winner Lifetime Achievement Award — American Society of Cinematographers (2006)

References

External links
 
 SN Richard Howard Kline at Find a Grave

1926 births
2018 deaths
American cinematographers
Burials at Los Angeles National Cemetery
Film people from Los Angeles
People from Encino, Los Angeles
United States Navy personnel of World War II